Locustville is a historic plantation house located near Ottoman, Lancaster County, Virginia.  It was built in 1855, and is a two-story, five-bay, gable roofed
Greek Revival style frame dwelling. It has a central passage plan and two interior end chimneys.  There is a rear ell which also has an interior end chimney.  It features a front porch with large Doric order fluted columns.

It was listed on the National Register of Historic Places in 1994.

References

Plantation houses in Virginia
Houses on the National Register of Historic Places in Virginia
Greek Revival houses in Virginia
Houses completed in 1855
Houses in Lancaster County, Virginia
National Register of Historic Places in Lancaster County, Virginia